Guerrando Lenzi (born 6 September 1939) is an Italian racing cyclist. He rode in the 1966 Tour de France.

References

External links
 

1939 births
Living people
Italian male cyclists
Place of birth missing (living people)
People from Quarrata
Sportspeople from the Province of Pistoia
Cyclists from Tuscany